Salsolicola is a genus of moths belonging to the subfamily Olethreutinae of the family Tortricidae.

Species
Salsolicola eremobia Falkovitsh, 1964
Salsolicola rjabovi Kuznetzov, 1960
Salsolicola stshetkini Kuznetzov, 1960

See also
List of Tortricidae genera

References

External links
Tortricid.net

Tortricidae genera
Olethreutinae